Stanley Segarel (born 4 March 1994) is a French professional footballer who plays for Feignies Aulnoye FC as a forward.

Segarel began his career with Amiens SC, for whom he made two appearances in the Coupe de la Ligue during the 2013–14 season. He was loaned out to Championnat de France amateur side AC Amiens for the second part of the same season, playing 11 league matches for the club and scoring twice. He went on to sign for Roye on a free transfer in the summer of 2014.

Personal life
Segarel was born in France and is of Martiniquais descent.

Career statistics
.

References

External links
 

1994 births
Living people
People from Villiers-le-Bel
Footballers from Val-d'Oise
French footballers
French people of Martiniquais descent
Association football forwards
Ligue 1 players
Championnat National players
Championnat National 2 players
Amiens SC players
AC Amiens players
US Roye-Noyon players
Gazélec Ajaccio players
Entente Feignies Aulnoye FC players